Nasirabad-e Olya (also Romanized as Naşīrābād-e ‘Olyā; also known as Naşrābād) is a village in Charuymaq-e Shomalesharqi Rural District, in the Central District of Hashtrud County, East Azerbaijan Province, Iran. At the 2006 census, its population was 184, in 30 families.

References 

Towns and villages in Hashtrud County